The 2019–20 Stephen F. Austin Lumberjacks basketball team represented Stephen F. Austin State University during the 2019–20 NCAA Division I men's basketball season. The Lumberjacks were led by fourth-year head coach Kyle Keller and played their home games at the William R. Johnson Coliseum in Nacogdoches, Texas as members of the Southland Conference. They finished the season 28–3, 19–1 in Southland play to win the Southland regular season championship. As the No. 1 seed, they received a double-bye to the semifinals of the Southland tournament, however, the tournament was cancelled amid the COVID-19 pandemic. With the Southland tournament's cancellation, they were awarded the Southland's automatic bid to the NCAA tournament, however, the NCAA tournament was also cancelled due to the same outbreak.

Previous season
The 2018–19 Stephen F. Austin Lumberjacks basketball team finished the season 14–16, 7–11 in Southland play to finish in ninth place.

Offseason

Departures

2019 recruiting class

Roster

Schedule 

|-
!colspan=12 style=| Regular season

|-
!colspan=9 !colspan=9 style=| Southland Conference tournament
|- style="background:#bbbbbb"
| style="text-align:center"|March 13, 20205:00 pm, ESPN+
| style="text-align:center"| (1)
| vs. Semifinals
| colspan=5 rowspan=1 style="text-align:center"|Cancelled due to the COVID-19 pandemic
| style="text-align:center"|Merrell CenterKaty, TX
|-

Rankings 

*AP does not release post-NCAA Tournament rankings

See also 
2019–20 Stephen F. Austin Ladyjacks basketball team

References 

Stephen F. Austin
Stephen F. Austin Lumberjacks basketball seasons
Stephen F. Austin Lumberjacks basketball
Stephen F. Austin Lumberjacks basketball